The 1946 Chatham Cup was the 19th annual nationwide knockout football competition in New Zealand. 

The competition was run on a regional basis, with regional associations each holding separate qualifying rounds. Teams taking part in the final rounds are known to have included Wellington Marist, Metro College (Auckland), Wanganui Old Boys, St. Andrews (Manawatu), Technical Old Boys (Christchurch), and Mosgiel.

The 1946 final
Wellington Marist's Jack Duffy was the only player to play in both the 1946 final and the 1932 final, Marist's previous Chatham Cup win. The 1946 team also contained three members of the Nunns family: Ces, Des, and Ray Nunns. Marist dominated the final, but it was Tech who took the lead in front of a crowd of 8000, with Cyril Thomas scoring during the first half. Jack Hatchard levelled for Marist before the break, then took the lead early in the second half through Henry Bell.

Results

Semi-finals

Final

References

Rec.Sport.Soccer Statistics Foundation New Zealand 1946 page

Chatham Cup
Chatham Cup
Chatham Cup